The Chegini tribe is a mostly sedentary Kurdish tribe which lives in Lorestan Province and scattered around Qazvin Province and Fars Province in Iran. The tribe also lives in Kurdistan Region and Kirkuk in Iraq. While the tribe migrated to Lorestan from Northwestern Iran, not much info exist on its origins.

Early scrutiny 
Charles MacGregor classified the tribe as  Kurdish in his topographical and ethnographical oeuvre from 1872. Oskar Mann however argued in 1910 that the tribe may be of Romani origin based on their name's resemblance with the term chingane, one of the exonyms for the Romani people.

According to the Encyclopædia Iranica there exists some non-Kurdish tribes in iran that have the same name, such as the clan of the Amala tribe by the name of Čegīnī in the Qašqāʾī tribal confederacy and the Jabbāra Arabs of Fārs by the name of Awlād-e Čegīnī.

History 
During the reign of Tahmasp I, the Chegini Kurds settled in Khorasan as they were on their way to India. In Khorasan, they prospered under the protection of the shah. In 1597, Sharafkhan Bidlisi wrote that the tribe lived by brigandage and intercepting the roads. Moreover, unlike other Kurdish tribes, they had no emir or mirza which could lead the tribe.

See also
Kurdish tribes

References

Further reading

Kurdistan
Iranian Kurdistan
Kurdish tribes
Lorestan Province